Surya University is an Indonesian private university that was founded in 2013 by the educational leader and physicist Prof. Yohanes Surya, Ph.D. Temporary campus was built in the area Scientia Garden, Gading Serpong, Tangerang - Banten. The university was officially established by the Minister of Education and Culture of Republic of Indonesia 07/E/O/2013 issued on January 10, 2013. The University has 3 faculties and 10 departments.

Faculties and Study Program
 Faculty of Green Economy & Digital Communication
Study Program:
 Agribusiness
 Green Economy
 Technopreneurship
 Digital Communication
 Actuarial Science
 Faculty of Clean Energy & Climate Change
Study Program:
 Physics - Energy Engineering
 Chemical & Green Process Engineering
 Environmental Engineering
 Faculty of Life Science
Study Program:
 Biotechnology & Neuroscience
 Human Computer Interaction
 Nutrition & Food Technology
 Marine Science

References

2013 establishments in Indonesia
Educational institutions established in 2013
Universities in Banten
Private universities and colleges in Indonesia